Ipratropium bromide/salbutamol, sold under the brand name Duoneb among others, is a combination medication used to treat chronic obstructive pulmonary disease (COPD). It contains ipratropium (an anticholinergic) and salbutamol (albuterol, a β2-adrenergic agonist).

Common side effects include sore throat, muscle cramps, and nausea. Other side effects may include bronchospasm, allergic reactions, and upper respiratory tract infections. Safety in pregnancy is unclear.

The combination was approved for medical use in the United States in 1996. It is available as a generic medication. In 2020, it was the 150th most commonly prescribed medication in the United States, with more than 3million prescriptions.

Society and culture
Since Combivent contains a chlorofluorocarbon-based propellant, its use was discontinued in 2013 in the United States and other countries. This was because Chlorofluorocarbons (CFC) are attributed to depletion of the ozone layer.

References

External links
Consumer Medication Information from PubMed 
 

Beta-adrenergic agonists
Boehringer Ingelheim
Bronchodilators
Combination drugs
Muscarinic antagonists
Wikipedia medicine articles ready to translate

de:Ipratropiumbromid
pl:Bromek ipratropium